Paul Le Drogo (Pontivy, 16 December 1905 — Sarzeau, 25 July 1966) was a French professional road bicycle racer. He was the younger brother of Ferdinand Le Drogo.

Major results

1927
GP Alceida
Lorient
1928
Circuit des As de l'Ouest
GP de la Sarthe
1929
Challenge Lux
Challenge Sigrand
Critérium National de Printemps
Tour de France:
Winner stage 6
1930
Paris - Rennes
1931
GP Cinquantenaire de la Route
1932
Circuit de la Manche
1935
Saint-Brieuc
1936
Saint-Brieuc

External links 

Official Tour de France results for Paul Le Drogo

1905 births
1966 deaths
People from Pontivy
French male cyclists
French Tour de France stage winners
Sportspeople from Morbihan
Cyclists from Brittany